Vanadium–gallium (V3Ga) is a superconducting alloy of vanadium and gallium. It is often used for the high field insert coils of superconducting electromagnets.

Vanadium–gallium tape is used in the highest field magnets (magnetic fields of ).

The high field characteristics can be improved by doping with high-Z elements such as Nb, Ta, Sn, Pt and Pb.

Physical Properties 

 has an A15 phase, which makes it extremely brittle. One must be extremely cautious not to over-bend the wire when handling it.

Superconducting properties
Critical temperature (Tc): 
Upper critical field (Hc2): Over .

Fabrication of superconductive wires or tapes
V3Ga wires can be formed using solid-state precipitation

History

References

Superconductors
Vanadium compounds
Gallium alloys